Abdallah Juma (born 21 July 1968) is a Kenyan weightlifter. He competed in the men's featherweight event at the 1992 Summer Olympics.

References

1968 births
Living people
Kenyan male weightlifters
Olympic weightlifters of Kenya
Weightlifters at the 1992 Summer Olympics
Place of birth missing (living people)
20th-century Kenyan people